Bernhard III (1 April 1851 – 16 January 1928), was the last reigning duke of Saxe-Meiningen.

Biography
Bernhard was born on 1 April 1851 at Meiningen in what was then the German Confederation,
as the eldest son of Georg II, Duke of Saxe-Meiningen and his first wife Princess Charlotte of Prussia.

Bernhard had one full sister, Princess Marie Elisabeth, and several half-brothers by his father's second marriage. 

From 1860 Bernhard was schooled by a Prof. Rossmann before he went to study at Heidelberg University in 1869. For the war against France he interrupted his studies and served as Ordonnanz-Offizier. After the war ended he resumed his studies at Leipzig. From 1873 he again served in the military and rose into the highest echelons: By 1905 he was Generaloberst and inspector general of the 2nd Army Inspection (Central Germany). In 1909, he became Generaloberst im Range eines Generalfeldmarschalls and retired from active service in 1912.

He married in Berlin on 18 February 1878 Princess Charlotte of Prussia, his second cousin, daughter of Frederick III, German Emperor and granddaughter of the Queen Victoria. They had one daughter: Princess Feodora of Saxe-Meiningen (b. Potsdam, 12 May 1879 - d. Schloß Neuhoff, 26 August 1945), married on 24 September 1898 to Heinrich XXX of Reuss-Köstritz.

Reign
Bernhard assumed the Duchy of Saxe-Meiningen after the death of his father in 1914. With the start of World War I Bernhard hoped to be assigned command over an army but was disappointed. In reaction he also withdrew from his role in the Duchy's government.

After Germany lost the war, the German revolution forced Bernhard to abdicate as duke on 10 November 1918. Like all the German princes he lost his title and state. He spent the rest of his life in his former country as a private citizen.

Bernhard died on 16 January 1928 in Meiningen. He is buried next to his wife in the park at Altenstein.

Interests
Despite his military career he also took a great interest in the arts. He was active as a composer, poet and translator. He was known in particular as an expert on Modern Greek and was renowned for translating German literature into Greek. For his historical studies, for which he repeatedly travelled to Greece and Asia Minor, the University of Breslau awarded him an honorary doctorate.

Honours
    Ernestine duchies: Grand Cross of the Saxe-Ernestine House Order, 1869; Joint Grand Master, 25 June 1914
  Kingdom of Prussia:
 Iron Cross (1870), 2nd Class
 Grand Commander's Cross of the Royal House Order of Hohenzollern, 2 April 1877
 Knight of the Order of the Black Eagle, 23 April 1877; with Collar, 1878
 : Grand Cross of the Order of the White Falcon, 1870
 : Grand Cross of the Grand Ducal Hessian Order of Ludwig, 18 February 1878
 : Grand Cordon of the Order of Leopold (military division), 25 February 1878
 : Grand Cross of the House and Merit Order of Duke Peter Friedrich Ludwig, with Crown in Gold, 18 February 1878
 :
 Knight of the House Order of Fidelity, 1881
 Knight of the Order of Berthold the First, 1881
 : Knight of the Order of the Rue Crown, 1885
   Austria-Hungary: Grand Cross of the Royal Hungarian Order of St. Stephen, 1887
 : Honorary Knight Grand Cross of the Most Honourable Order of the Bath (civil division), 21 June 1887
 : Grand Cordon of the Supreme Order of the Chrysanthemum, 5 February 1896
 : Knight of the Imperial Order of St. Alexander Nevsky, 1896

Ancestry

References

|-

1851 births
1928 deaths
Colonel generals of Saxony
Dukes of Saxe-Meiningen
People from Meiningen
Monarchs who abdicated
Grand Crosses of the Order of Saint Stephen of Hungary
Annulled Honorary Knights Grand Cross of the Order of the Bath
Recipients of the Iron Cross (1870), 2nd class
German military personnel of the Franco-Prussian War
Military personnel from Thuringia